Yolanda Castaño Pereira (Santiago de Compostela, 1977) is a Galician painter, literary critic and poet.

Since 1990, she has lived in A Coruña, where she studied Spanish Philology at the University of A Coruña.

She translated her poems to Spanish and has been the General Secretary at the Association of Galician-language Writers (Spanish: Asociación de Escritores en Lengua Gallega / Galician: Asociación de Escritores en Lingua Galega) and at Letras de Cal. She has also collaborated in several publications, such as Festa da palabra silenciada, Dorna, O Correo Galego (El Correo Gallego), A nosa terra and El Mundo.

Pereira is co-director of journal Valdeleite (together with Olga Novo) and works for the TV programme Cifras e Letras (TVG version of Countdown).

Works
Elevar as pálpebras. Corunna: Espiral Maior, 1995.
Delicia. Corunna: Espiral Maior, 1998.
Edónica. Corunna: Espiral Maior, 2000.
O libro da egoísta. Vigo: Galaxia S.A., 2003.
Libro de la egoísta. Madrid: Visor, 2006.
Profundidade de Campo. Corunna: Espiral Maior, 2007
Erofanía, Espiral Maior, 2009
A segunda lingua, PEN Clube de Galicia, 2014

Awards 
Antonio García Hermida Award
Atlántida Prize (1993)
Francisco Fernández del Riego Prize
III Fermín Bouza Brey Prize (1994)
II John Carballeira Poetry Award (1997)
Premio de la Crítica de poesía gallega (1998)
Espiral Mayor Poetry Award (2007)

References

External links 
Yolanda Castaño's Webpage

1977 births
Living people
20th-century Spanish painters
21st-century Spanish painters
20th-century Spanish poets
21st-century Spanish poets
20th-century Spanish women writers
21st-century Spanish women writers
Spanish women painters
Spanish women poets
Writers from Galicia (Spain)
People from Santiago de Compostela
Galician-language writers
Women writers from Galicia (Spain)